Horodiște is a village in Călărași District, Moldova.

Notable people
 Vasile Țanțu 
 Liliana Palihovici

References

Villages of Călărași District